Vizhinjam Cave Temple is an ancient Hindu temple at Vizhinjam, near Trivandrum in southern Kerala, India. 

The granite cave encloses a one-celled shrine with a loose sculpture of Vinadhara Dakshinamurti. The outer wall of the cave depicts unfinished reliefs of Siva as "Tripurantakara" on the left and as "Nataraja" with Parvati on the right (the unfinished Pallava dvarapalakas).

The temple is located about 17 kilometers from Trivandrum city centre. Vizhinjam served as headquarters of the Ay kings who ruled the southern parts of Kerala in the 8th century.

Image gallery

References

https://captajitvadakayil.in/2021/02/06/sanatana-dharma-hinduism-exhumed-and-resurrected-part-120-capt-ajit-vadakayil/

External links
 
 Vizhinjam Rock Cut Cave, Thiruvananthapuram

Caves of Kerala
Archaeological sites in Kerala
Monuments of National Importance in Kerala
Hindu temples in Thiruvananthapuram